Featherston railway station is a single-platform, urban railway station serving the town of Featherston in the Wairarapa district of New Zealand. The station lies on the Wairarapa Line, and is located between Harrison Street West and Harrison Street East. It is thirty-five minutes journey time to Masterton, or fifty five minutes journey time to Wellington.

This station also serves a larger area of the South Wairarapa district, in particular the residents of Martinborough, as it is the closest station to several settlements outside of Featherston.

The station building houses a ticket office from which fares for the Wairarapa Connection service are sold.  Goods have not been consigned from Featherston since 1986.

History 
Formation work on the line reached Featherston on 17 August 1878, with plate-laying completed the following month in September. Though the first train reached Featherston in late September, it was not until 16 October that the railway was opened for public use.

Featherston was initially a station of some importance, being the railhead for two years until the opening of the line through to Masterton. It was opened with a seven-room station building, a  goods shed, a locomotive shed and watering facilities for the locomotives, but no coal supply until 1888. There were also refreshment rooms, but they, along with the locomotive depot, were removed in 1891. With the closure of the engine shed, all locomotives working the southern Wairarapa district – with the exception of the locomotive working the Greytown Branch – were based at Cross Creek. The original wooden station building was replaced with the present-day structure in 1982.

The goods shed was demolished, but the loading bank and two loops remain. An aggregate supplies company now occupies the area of the yard where the goods shed used to be.

 all remaining sidings were in the process of being removed except the 1st road.

Future 
In 2019/20 the GWRC is to "renew" the Featherston railway station.

As part of the New Zealand Upgrade Programme announced by the government on 29 January 2020, a second platform will be installed at Featherston.

Services 
The only trains with scheduled stops at Featherston station are the passenger services of the Wairarapa Connection. There are five such services both ways Monday to Thursday, six services on Fridays and two services each way on Saturdays and Sundays.

There is a shuttle bus service operated by Wairarapa Coachlines to transport passengers between Martinborough and the Featherston railway station. These services are timed to meet the daily commuter trains, however there is currently (as at August 2013) no service on Sunday.

Gallery

See also 
Martinborough Branch

References

Further reading

External links 
 Passenger service timetables from Metlink and Tranz Metro.
 Wairarapa Coach Lines.

Public transport in the Wellington Region
Railway stations in New Zealand
Railway stations opened in 1878
Buildings and structures in the Wairarapa
1878 establishments in New Zealand
Featherston, New Zealand